Nico Motchebon (born 13 November 1969 in Berlin) is a former German 800 metres runner.

His personal best of 1:43.91 was set on 31 July 1996 in the 800 m final of the 1996 Summer Olympics in Atlanta, where he finished fifth. Motchebon won bronze medals at the 1993 and 1999 IAAF World Indoor Championships. He also set a temporary European indoor record over 800 m in 1995. His 600 m indoor personal best stood as the indoor 600 m world record from 1999 until 2017.

Before turning to athletics in late 1992, he competed in the modern pentathlon. He even qualified for the 1992 Summer Olympics but ultimately he did not participate.

He is of Cameroonian descent through his father.

International competitions

Personal bests
 100 metres - 11.11 sec - 14 September 1993 in Berlin, Germany
 400 metres - 46.71 sec - 31 May 1997 in Athens, Greece
 600 metres - 1:15.31 min - 3 September 1997 in Dortmund, Germany
 800 metres - 1:43.91 min - 31 July 1996 in Atlanta, United States
 1000 metres - 2:20.47 min - 3 June 1994 in Jena, Germany
 1500 metres - 3:52.45 min - 5 September 1995 in Rieti, Italy

Indoor

 400 m - 46.83 sec - 18 January 1999 in Chemnitz, Germany
 600 m - 1:15.12 min - 28 February 1999 in Sindelfingen, Germany
 800 m - 1:44.88 min - 5 February 1995 in Stuttgart, Germany

References

 
 Sports Reference

1969 births
Living people
Athletes from Berlin
German male middle-distance runners
German male modern pentathletes
Olympic athletes of Germany
Athletes (track and field) at the 1996 Summer Olympics
World Athletics Championships athletes for Germany
German national athletics champions
German people of Cameroonian descent
Universiade medalists in athletics (track and field)
Universiade bronze medalists for Germany
Medalists at the 1993 Summer Universiade